Austext is the former Australian teletext service based in Brisbane, Queensland. The service was carried and operated by the Seven Network and its affiliates over most of Australia. It carried news, financial information, weather, lottery results, a TV guide and other information, as well as closed captioning for programs. The service was freely available for viewing on any television, computer or other device with teletext functionality and the ability to access and view Channel Seven, or one of Seven's regional affiliates Prime, GWN or Southern Cross. Seven first began test Teletext services in 1977 with useful information being transmitted in 1982 in Brisbane and Sydney. Austext was shut down in September 2009.

Over the years, the service has had various names including SevenTel.

Content

The information available on Austext pages included the latest in news, weather, racing, general interests and a television guide. Also available are contact details for Austext and state deaf associations.

The news pages include the latest in business, national news, international news, sport, science and technology, and showbiz.
The weather pages include same day forecast capital city temperatures, same day forecast conditions and minimum/maximum temperatures as well as current temperature, humidity, dew point, wind speed, wind direction, sunrise and sunset times, and an outlook for the next five days  for major centres across Australia which was all supplied by the Bureau of Meteorology. The racing pages included a national TAB racing index which ceased operation on 4 August 2009. The general interest pages included items such as lottery results, daily horoscopes and a joke of the day. The service also carried a TV guide with listings for the Seven Network in its five metropolitan markets, as well as listings for other networks, both metropolitan and regional, until 2007 when they disappeared.

Closed captioning for programs on the Seven Network's channels are also included in the Austext system. When produced by the Australian Caption Centre, they were branded as "Supertext". To access closed captions through Austext, viewers enter the navigation code number 801 on an analog television or by pressing the Text, CC, Subtitle or a designated coloured button (depending on make and model) on their digital set top box or television.

Closure
In July 2009 Seven announced that Austext would shut down on 30 September 2009. This was due to claims from the network that the technology had come to the end of its useful service life and is not commercially viable to replace. Seven also noted the wide availability of alternate sources of information now accessible to viewers such as Seven's own websites. Despite the closure, closed captioning services continued to remain available.

The onscreen closedown notice read:

See also

Ceefax
 List of teletext services

References

Seven Network
Teletext
Mass media in Brisbane
1977 in Australian television
1982 in Australian television
1982 establishments in Australia
2009 disestablishments in Australia